The Republican Defence Army (RDA) was a splinter group from the Provisional Irish Republican Army that emerged in 2006. The group was blamed for a handful of minor assaults and threats of violence, as well as claims the group was linked to a murder in Strabane. Little is known about the group, and in 2011 it was considered defunct.

It was acknowledged by the Independent Monitoring Commission (IMC) in Northern Ireland. The IMC reported that the leadership of Sinn Féin have engaged in dialogue with the RDA regarding their views for peaceful progression of their campaign and Sinn Féin's strategies.  The outcome of these negotiations has not been made public.

References

2006 establishments in Northern Ireland
Dissident Irish republican campaign
Irish republican militant groups
Organizations established in 2006
Provisional Irish Republican Army